is a railway station on the Kashii Line operated by JR Kyushu in Higashi-ku, Fukuoka, Fukuoka Prefecture, Japan.

Lines

Station layout 
The station, which is unstaffed, consists of two side platforms serving two tracks. A small station building serves as a waiting room. An automatic ticket vending machine is installed on one of the platforms. The station also has another entrance on the other side of the tracks. This is also equipped with farecard readers and leads to a level crossing which links the two platforms with ramps.

Adjacent stations

History
On 19 September 1942, the company, now renamed the Hakata Bay Railway and Steamship Company, with a few other companies, merged into the Kyushu Electric Tramway. Three days later, the new conglomerate, which had assumed control of the station, became the Nishi-Nippon Railroad (Nishitetsu). Japanese Government Railways (JGR) took over control of the station. The station was renamed Gannosu and the track which served it was designated the Kashii Line. With the privatization of Japanese National Railways (JNR), the successor of JGR, on 1 April 1987, JR Kyushu took over control of the station. The old name Nata was given to the next station on the line which opened in 1960.

On 14 March 2015, the station, along with others on the line, became a remotely managed "Smart Support Station". Under this scheme, although the station became unstaffed, passengers using the automatic ticket vending machines or ticket gates could receive assistance via intercom from staff at a central support centre.

Passenger statistics
In fiscal 2016, the station was used by an average of 377 passengers daily (boarding passengers only), and it ranked 276th among the busiest stations of JR Kyushu.

References

External links
Gannosu (JR Kyushu)

Railway stations in Fukuoka Prefecture
Railway stations in Japan opened in 1904